Róbert Zsigó (born 10 November 1967) is a Hungarian politician, who served as the mayor of Baja from 2010 to 2014. He is also member of the National Assembly (MP) for Baja (Bács-Kiskun County Constituency IX then VI) since 1998. He was appointed Secretary of State for Food Chain Supervision on 15 June 2014.

References

1967 births
Living people
Fidesz politicians
Mayors of places in Hungary
Members of the National Assembly of Hungary (1998–2002)
Members of the National Assembly of Hungary (2002–2006)
Members of the National Assembly of Hungary (2006–2010)
Members of the National Assembly of Hungary (2010–2014)
Members of the National Assembly of Hungary (2014–2018)
Members of the National Assembly of Hungary (2018–2022)
Members of the National Assembly of Hungary (2022–2026)
People from Bács-Kiskun County